WQTL (106.1 FM, "Kool Oldies 106.1") is an oldies music formatted radio station in Tallahassee, Florida, United States, owned by Adams Radio Group.  Its studios are located in northeast Tallahassee, and its transmitter is located due north of downtown Tallahassee.

From 2009 until April 2, 2012, WQTL aired an oldies/classic hits format as "Q106.1."  On April 2, WQTL's oldies format was dropped and the station began stunting with music by The Beatles. A new format was to launch sometime soon. On April 17, 2012, WQTL ended stunting and launched a classic rock/AAA format, branded as "106.1 The Path".

On July 31, 2015, WQTL rebranded as "106.1 The Sound".

On April 11, 2018, WQTL changed their format from classic rock/AAA to oldies, branded aa "Kool Oldies 106.1".

Previous logos

References

External links

Oldies radio stations in the United States
QTL
Radio stations established in 1992
1992 establishments in Florida